Alfred Zech, also known as Alfred Czech (12 October 1932 – 13 June 2011), was a German child soldier who received the Iron Cross, 2nd Class at the age of 12 years.

Early life and military career
Zech was born in Goldenau, Upper Silesia (Złotniki, Opole Voivodeship, Poland) and was enrolled in the Deutsches Jungvolk, as was mandatory under Nazi rule. In early 1945, Goldenau was under attack by advancing elements of the Soviet Red Army. During the attack, he saw a number of German soldiers injured by mortar fire, and decided to use his father's farm cart to retrieve them. He made two trips, bringing a dozen wounded to his family home.

According to Zech, a German general appeared at the family farm several days later and asked the parents to send the boy to Berlin, for an audience with Adolf Hitler. His father agreed and Zech joined several other Jungvolk child soldiers were decorated by Hitler with Iron Crosses (2nd class) for bravery. The recording of the ceremony was widely circulated by Nazi propaganda. A photograph of Zech being inspected by Hitler was captured by Büro Laux, a German Foreign Ministry photo agency, and later – via Pressens Bild – distributed to the Associated Press.

At the subsequent banquet Zech stated that he volunteered to remain in service, unaware that his hometown was already captured and his father was killed in action, after he was pressed into the Volkssturm. Zech was sent to the front in Freudenthal (presently Czech Silesia). There he was wounded in combat, and captured. After his release in 1947, he returned home, learning about his father's death upon arrival.

Later life
As an adult, Zech joined the Polish United Workers' Party in order to receive leave to emigrate. In 1964, he settled in West Germany where he worked as a laborer.

Personal life
Zech was married and had ten children.

See also
 12th SS Panzer Division Hitlerjugend
 Armin D. Lehmann

References

External links
 Newsreel of the ceremony at which Zech received the Iron Cross

1932 births
2011 deaths
People from the Province of Upper Silesia
Child soldiers in World War II
Recipients of the Iron Cross (1939), 2nd class
German prisoners of war in World War II
People from Opole County
Hitler Youth members
Volkssturm personnel